Taaningichthys is a genus of lanternfishes.

Etymology
The genus is named in honour of Åge Vedel Tåning, a Danish lanternfish expert.

Species
There are currently three recognized species in this genus:
 Taaningichthys bathyphilus (Tåning, 1928) (Deepwater lanternfish)
 Taaningichthys minimus (Tåning, 1928)
 Taaningichthys paurolychnus Davy, 1972

References

Myctophidae
Marine fish genera
Taxa named by Rolf Ling Bolin